David Dziurzynski (born October 6, 1989) is a Canadian professional ice hockey player who is currently playing with the Kansas City Mavericks in the ECHL. He previously played with the Ottawa Senators of the National Hockey League (NHL).

Playing career
Dziurzynski, who played junior in the British Columbia Hockey League with the Alberni Valley Bulldogs, was signed by the Ottawa Senators on April 6, 2010 as an undrafted free agent to a three-year contract.

At training camp in 2010, Dziurzynski made the roster of the Senators' American Hockey League (AHL) affiliate Binghamton Senators. He was a member of the 2011 AHL Calder Cup championship squad. Dziurzynski returned to Binghamton for the 2011–12 and 2012–13 seasons. Dziurzynski made his NHL debut, playing for Ottawa in Toronto against the Toronto Maple Leafs on February 16, 2013. Three days later he scored his first NHL goal against Rick DiPietro of the New York Islanders. And on February 25 scored his second against Carey Price of the Montreal Canadiens. On March 6, 2013, he was knocked out by a punch in a fight against the Toronto Maple Leafs' Frazer McLaren resulting in a concussion that kept him from playing for over 10 days. Dziurzynski was reassigned to Binghamton later that month.

The Ottawa Senators later re-signed Dziurzynski to a one-year, two-way contract on July 10, 2013. On July 3, 2014 the Senators re-signed Dziurzynski to a two-year, two-way contract.

After 6 seasons within the Senators organization, Dziurzynski left as a free agent to sign a one-year contract abroad with German club, Iserlohn Roosters of the Deutsche Eishockey Liga on July 27, 2016.

Personal
Dziurzynski's younger brother, Darian, was selected by the Arizona Coyotes in the fifth round of the 2011 NHL Entry Draft.

Career statistics

Awards and honors

References

External links

1989 births
Living people
Alberni Valley Bulldogs players
Belleville Senators players
Binghamton Senators players
Canadian ice hockey left wingers
Florida Everblades players
Iserlohn Roosters players
Kansas City Mavericks players
Sportspeople from Lloydminster
Lloydminster Bobcats players
Ottawa Senators players
Undrafted National Hockey League players
Utica Comets players
Ice hockey people from Alberta
Canadian expatriate ice hockey players in Germany
Canadian expatriate ice hockey players in the United States